Boronia pinnata is a plant in the citrus family, Rutaceae, and is endemic to New South Wales. It is an erect, woody shrub with pinnate leaves and groups of between three and forty pink flowers arranged in leaf axils. It flowers in spring and early summer and is found in coastal areas between Ballina and Jervis Bay.

Description
The leaves are pinnate with up to thirteen narrow elliptic to narrow oblong leaflets. Between three and twenty, sometimes as many as forty flowers are arranged in groups in the leaf axils. The eight stamens have hairy edges.

Taxonomy and naming
Boronia pinnata was first formally described in 1798 by James Edward Smith who published the description in his book ''Tracts relating to natural history. The specific epithet (pinnata) is a Latin word meaning "feathered" or "plumed". This was the only pinnate-leaved species of boronia described by Smith.

Distribution and habitat
This boronia grows in dry forest and heath on sandstone in near-coastal areas between the Nowra district and Ballina.

Use in horticulture
One of the easier boronias to grow in gardens, B. pinnata does best in a sheltered position with rocks aiding a shallow root run and it benefits from light pruning.

References 

pinnata
Flora of New South Wales
Plants described in 1798
Taxa named by James Edward Smith